La Petite Gironde was a French daily newspaper from the south and southwest regions of France. It was founded in 1872 and lasted until 1944.  With a “moderate republican” tendency, it wanted to be a large regional republican newspaper and a widely consumed cultural product. Originally a moderate centrist, its editorial line straightened out over the years, until it became close to that of L'Action française in the turmoil of the First World War. The newspaper was a collaborationist during the Occupation, which led to its ban late in World War II.

References

Defunct newspapers published in France
Publications established in 1872
Publications disestablished in 1944
1872 establishments in France
1944 disestablishments in France
Daily newspapers published in France